PJP4 is an oilfield services company headquartered in Reynosa, Mexico.

Business overview 

The company has operations in more than eight countries in the Americas, and employs more than 1000 people across its operations, from the U.S. through Venezuela. PJP4 claims to have a daily production of over 250000 barrels of petroleum and 350 million normal cubic feet of natural gas. The company is certified ISO 9001:2008, OHSAS 18001 and ISO 14001.

Locations 

The company is located along the coast of the Gulf of Mexico with offices in Poza Rica, Veracruz; Villahermosa, Tabasco and the headquarters in Reynosa, Mexico. Outside of Mexico, the company has offices in Caracas, Venezuela; Bogota, Colombia; Mission, Texas and Laredo, Texas.

Services 

 Operations and Maintenance
- Management of mechanical and artificial systems
- Control and monitoring systems
- Testing of electrical systems
 Inspection and Evaluation
- Cathodic inspection
- Mechanical integrity
 Assessment of Conformity and Audit of Operational Control
 Personal Training and Certification
 General Engineering
 Construction
 Process Engineering and Product Optimization

See also

 List of oilfield service companies

References

External links 

 

Oilfield services companies
Engineering companies of Mexico